A voting system is a set of rules for translating sets of preferences as expressed in an election into actual decisions.

Voting system may also refer to:

Voting
 Vote counting system, the hardware, software, and procedures used to count votes in an election
 Voting machine, technology used to collect and aggregate votes
 Voting methods in deliberative assemblies

Other
 Diversity combining system used in two-way radio

See also